Evelina Vorontsova (Russian: Эвелина Воронцова; born 19 April 1972, in Moscow) is a Russian/Dutch concert pianist and pedagogue.

Biography

Evelina Vorontsova studied under Rudolf Kehrer, Mikhail Voskresensky, Elena Kuznetsova at the Moscow Conservatory and graduated with a Gold Medal (1993). After she received the 2nd prize at the International Franz Liszt Piano Competition, her studies were continued under Jan Wijn. Having made her orchestral debut at the age of 11 with J.S. Bach's Concerto IV in A major, BWV 1055. she has played in various countries as Japan, Germany and France.
Aside from her concert career, she leads the foundation ArtiMusica, which initiates projects that merge different artistic disciplines.

Competition prizes

 4th prize Rachmaninoff competition (1990), special prize for best performance of the Preludes and Etudes-Tableaux
 2nd prize International Franz Liszt Piano Competition (1992)
 1st prize Concorso Internazionale per Pianoforte e Orchestra (2006)
 2nd prize Concorso Internazionale di Esecuzione Musicale (2007) with special prize Primio Virtuosite prize

Discography
 2002 Bach, Scarlatti, Franck, Tchaikovsky, Chopin  & Scriabin
 2016 Rachmaninoff: Piano Sonata No.2 Op.31, Corelli Variations Op.42, Moments Musicaux Op.16

References

External links
 Stereophile | Recording of the Month August 2017: Rachmaninoff Piano Works.

Russian classical pianists
Russian women pianists
Living people
Moscow Conservatory alumni
1972 births
21st-century classical pianists
Women classical pianists
21st-century women pianists